St Wilfrid's Church, Kirkby-in-Ashfield is a parish church in the Church of England in Kirkby-in-Ashfield, Nottinghamshire.

The church is Grade II listed by the Department for Digital, Culture, Media and Sport as it is a building of special architectural or historic interest.

History

The medieval church was destroyed by fire and a new church was erected in 1907 by the Duke of Portland to a design by the architect Louis Ambler. The church has one of the most beautiful interiors with a fine reredos and chancel screen.

The church of St Wilfrid stands on a site believed to have been first used for a church in the seventh century AD and an ancient church is mentioned in the Domesday survey of 1086.

See also
Listed buildings in Kirkby-in-Ashfield

Sources

Kirkby-in-Ashfield
Kirkby in Ashfield, St Wilfrid
Kirkby-in-Ashfield